Rambo (stylized on-screen as R.a.m.b.o.) were an American punk rock band based in Philadelphia. The band identified with the straight edge, anarchist, vegan, crust punk, cyclist and thrashcore movements. Known for hectic live performances, the band toured extensively in the United States, Europe, Australia and Southeast Asia, including several sections of the latter continent previously unvisited by touring Western rock bands.

History 
R.A.M.B.O. was formed in 1999 by singer Tony Croasdale (known as Tony Pointless), guitarist Andy Wheeler, bassist Beau Brendley and drummer Jeremy Gewertz, the latter two of whom played in Philadelphia-based hardcore band Kill The Man Who Questions. Croasdale was known in the city's punk rock scene for his involvement with the underground venue Stalag 13, and would later co-run a summer music fest that became unofficially known as the Pointless Fest.  Initially, the group performed in camouflage face paint and military fatigue, but following the events of 9/11, ceased this policy in fear of its presenting "the wrong" (i.e., a pro-American militancy) message.

In 2000, Brendley and Gewertz left the group.  Gewertz would go on to play with An Albatross, Brendley with El Toro de Oro.  They were replaced by Bull Gervasi (formerly of Policy Of Three) and Todd Hoffman (of Virginia Black Lung and the Fighting Dogs), respectively; the lineup was rounded out by second guitarist John Robinson (a former member of Good Clean Fun).  Artist Mike Bukowski soon started being considered a member of the band in the capacity of "propagandist" and relating to the group as did Gee Vaucher to Crass.

Robinson, Hoffman, and Bukowski would go on to leave the group one by one, leaving Croasdale, Wheeler, Gervasi, and drummer Dave Rosenstrauss (along with Mick Brochu, a part-time live guitarist) as the group's final lineup before disbanding in 2007.

R.A.M.B.O. produced two full-lengths; Wall of Death the System, on the 625 Thrashcore label, and Bring It!, on Havoc Records.  The band was also known for its unrelenting and widespread touring, as well as its theatrical live shows featuring many cardboard props depicting humorous-yet-political scenarios based around their anarcho-syndicalist convictions.

According to a band interview conducted in May 2021, the band is working a new album scheduled for late 2021/early 2022.

Discography

Tapes 
"No Circle Pits in Heaven" (self-released)

EPs 
Split 7" with Crucial Unit – (Ed Walters Records)
Split 7" with Caustic Christ – (Busted Heads Records / Havoc Records)

Albums 
Wall of Death the System (625 Thrashcore, 2001)
Bring It! (Havoc Records, 2005)

References

External links 
R.A.M.B.O. on Myspace
Havoc Records
625 Thrashcore
RAMBO: Have Faith in the Youth, This Generation is Poised to Stir Some Shit Up (2021 Interview)

American crust and d-beat groups
Hardcore punk groups from Pennsylvania
Straight edge groups